Kim Gwi-Hwa (born 15 March 1970) is a South Korean football coach, former player

Kim was appointed assistant manager of Daegu FC on 4 January 2011.

After a season stint with Daegu, he was named as head coach of Gimhae FC in the Korean Second Division in November 2011.

References

External links

Kim Gwi-hwa – National Team stats at KFA 

1970 births
Living people
Gyeongnam FC managers
Association football midfielders
South Korean footballers
Busan IPark players
Gimcheon Sangmu FC players
FC Seoul players
K League 1 players
FC Seoul non-playing staff
Footballers at the 1992 Summer Olympics
Olympic footballers of South Korea
Sportspeople from South Gyeongsang Province
Ajou University alumni
South Korean football managers